The 2021–22 Dixie State Trailblazers women's basketball team represented Dixie State University in the 2021–22 NCAA Division I women's basketball season. They were led by sixth-year head coach JD Gustin. The Trailblazers played their home games at Burns Arena, located in St. George, Utah.

Dixie State's final season under that name; the school will change its name to Utah Tech University effective with the 2022–23 school year. The Trailblazers nickname is not affected.

Roster

Schedule

|-
!colspan=9 style=|Non-conference regular season

|-
!colspan=9 style=|WAC regular season

Schedule source:

See also
2021–22 Dixie State Trailblazers men's basketball team

References

Dixie State
Utah Tech Trailblazers women's basketball seasons
Dixie State
Dixie State